Ethmia gigantea is a moth in the family Depressariidae. It is found in Mexico.

The ground color of the forewings is dark
brownish black, nearly unicolorous on the costal half. The ground color of the hindwings is whitish, semitraslucent basally, becoming pale brownish on the apical half. Adults have been recorded in April, June and August.

References

Moths described in 1914
gigantea